Open Letter to the Damned is the first album by As Fast As after changing their name from Rocktopus.  It was released in 2006 by Octone Records and is a reworking of their 2004 independently released album of the same name.

Track listing
"Blame It on the Drugs" – 3:01
"Florida Sunshine" – 3:29
"Special" – 3:16
"Gretchen My Captain" – 3:43
"This Time" – 3:36
"Wasted Youth" – 4:14
"Open Letter to the Damned" – 3:52
"Skin the Kat" – 4:56
"If I Only Knew" – 3:42
"This Is Real" – 4:53
"Something Fierce" – 3:39

2004 independent release
"This is Real" – 4:16
"Gretchen My Captain" – 3:46
"This Time" – 3:27
"Sandalz 4 Shoes" – 3:00
"Jenny Better" – 3:19
"All These Words" – 2:52
"Need A Light?" – 0:53  
"Wasted Youth" – 3:12
"Open Letter to the Damned" – 4:46
"Technicolor Love" – 2:32
"Thinking About You" – 1:15
"Vulnerable" - 3:52
"At Least I Tasted Love" - 4:38
"Stuck Here With You" - 4:27
"Bury Me" - 4:09
"This Is Real Reprise" - 1:03
"Until September" - 3:22

2004 debut albums
As Fast As albums
Albums produced by David Kahne